Ana Carolina Ugarte (born March 7, 1992) is a Venezuelan model and beauty pageant titleholder who was appointed by Osmel Sousa, the national director of the Miss Venezuela pageant, and represented Venezuela at the Miss World 2017 pageant, to be held in Sanya (China), on November 18, 2017. Ugarte who stands 1.80 (5 ft 11 in), competed as Miss Monagas 2013, one of 26 finalists in her country's national beauty pageant, she obtained the Miss Elegance award at the Interactive Beauty Gala, which was the preliminary of Miss Venezuela 2013.

References

External links
 Miss Venezuela Official Website
 Miss World Official Website

1992 births
Living people
Venezuelan female models
Venezuelan beauty pageant winners
People from Maturín
Miss World 2017 delegates